Stenodactylus affinis, also known as the Iranian short-fingered gecko or Murray's comb-fingered gecko, is a species of gecko. It is found in  Iran's southeastern Khuzestan Province and southern Fars Province), Iraq.

Size 
Medium-sized, up to in minimum 60 mm from snout to anus.

References 

affinis
Geckos of Iran
Geckos of Iraq
Reptiles described in 1884
Taxa named by James A. Murray (zoologist)